Joelson José Inácio (born 10 July 1983), known as just Joelson, is a Brazilian footballer who played as a forward.

Career
Born in Brazil, Joelson started his professional career at Italy along with his elder brother Piá. He finished as 2001–02 Campionato Nazionale Primavera runner–up with Atalanta under-20 youth team. In 2002–03 season, he left for Pavia on loan with option to co-own the player. In June 2004, Atalanta bought back Joelson and sold him to nearby club AlbinoLeffe in another co-ownership deal, where he joined loan with ex-Primavera teammate Mauro Belotti, Gabriele Perico and Mauro Minelli who recent bought back by Atalanta. In June 2005 AlbinoLeffe signed Joelson outright. Since January 2007 he did not play for AlbinoLeffe as he signed a pre-contract with his new club.

Reggina
He joined Reggina on free transfer while his contract expire with AlbinoLeffe. He played as backup of Nicola Amoruso, Fabio Ceravolo and Stephen Makinwa, only made 4 starts. But his appearances already ahead other new signing likes Mike Tullberg and Christian Stuani.

In 2008–09 season he left for Serie B side Pisa, but the club relegated and went bankrupt.

He returned to Reggina after the club relegated from Serie A. he played once before left for fellow Serie B club Grosseto.

Lega Pro clubs
In mid-2010 he left for Benevento. In January 2011 he was signed by Cremonese along with Gabriele Aldegani. As part of the deal, Marco Paoloni, moved to Benevento. He became free agent in 2011 and in November rejoined his brother Piá in Pergocrema. The brother also qualified as youth coach in summer 2011. On 24 August 2012 he was signed by Siena as a free agent, however for non-EU quota trade.

In September 2012 he was banned for  years for involvement in the 2011–12 Italian football scandal.

Lecco
In January 2015 Joelson was signed by Serie D club Lecco.

Final years as amateur
In December 2019, Joelson moved to Italian fifth tier, Eccellenza, club ASD Lemine Almenno Calcio.

He successively spent the 2020–21 season with Eccellenza club Mapello, coached by his friend and former teammate Vinicio Espinal.

Coaching career
In July 2021, following the departure of Espinal to join Lazio as part of their coaching staff, Eccellenza Lombardy amateurs Mapello appointed Joelson as their new head coach.

On 1 December 2022, he was sacked by Mapello, leaving the club in second place in the league table.

References

External links
 Profile at La Gazzetta dello Sport (2007–08)  
 Profile at La Gazzetta dello Sport (2006–07)  
 Profile at AIC.Football.it  
 

Brazilian footballers
Brazilian expatriate footballers
Serie A players
Serie B players
Serie C players
Serie D players
Atalanta B.C. players
U.C. AlbinoLeffe players
F.C. Pavia players
Reggina 1914 players
Pisa S.C. players
F.C. Grosseto S.S.D. players
Benevento Calcio players
U.S. Cremonese players
U.S. Pergolettese 1932 players
A.C.N. Siena 1904 players
Calcio Lecco 1912 players
A.C. Ponte San Pietro Isola S.S.D. players
U.S.D. Caravaggio players
Association football forwards
Footballers from São Paulo (state)
Brazilian expatriate sportspeople in Italy
Expatriate footballers in Italy
1983 births
Living people
People from Ibitinga